This was the first edition of the tournament. Gabriela Dabrowski and María José Martínez Sánchez won the title, defeating Anna-Lena Friedsam and Laura Siegemund in the final, 6–4, 6–2.

Seeds

Draw

Draw

References
 Main Draw

Mallorca Open - Doubles
Doubles